Phố Bảng is a township of Đồng Văn District, Hà Giang Province, Vietnam.

References

Populated places in Hà Giang province
Townships in Vietnam